The 770s decade ran from January 1, 770, to December 31, 779.

Significant people
Al-Mansur
Al-Mahdi
Al-Fadl ibn Salih

References